Sudigundalu is a 1968 Indian Telugu-language philosophical film, produced by Akkineni Nageswara Rao, Adurthi Subba Rao under the Chakravarthy Chitra banner and directed by Adurthi Subba Rao. It stars Akkineni Nageswara Rao, and has music composed by K. V. Mahadevan. It was released on 28 June 1968. The film won the National Film Award for Best Feature Film in Telugu, The Nandi Award for Best Feature Film, and the Filmfare Award for Best Film – Telugu. It marked the debut of Nageswara Rao's son Nagarjuna as child artist in a cameo. The cult classic film was screened at the Tashkent Film Festival, and the International Film Festival of India.

Plot 
Justice Chandra Shekaram is a very kind and noble person who gives shelter to the families of the criminals whom he has convicted. All of them live like a family and rear Chandra Shekaram's only son Raja who is motherless with love and affection. One day Raja goes missing and everyone becomes panicked, next day, unexpectedly, he is found dead.

Police make a serious investigation and finds out that two youth Vikram Kumar and Sandhya Rani, children of big shots of high society slaughtered Raja for fun. Here Mr. Moneybags try their level best to acquit them using their money and power but fails. At this point, Chandra Shekaram wears the pleader's shoes and appears in the favour of the young culprits to bring out the real motive of the murder which shocks the entire court.

Now Chandra Shekaram proves that these children become spoiled brats due to lack and improper parental care and the argument unites with cultural deviations which our country is going to face in the future generation. Ultimately, he affirms that parents should play a key role in raising their children as responsible citizens. In the end, the court changes its judgment when Chandra Shekharam breathes his last in the court hall.

Cast

Soundtrack 

Music composed by K. V. Mahadevan. The music released on Audio Company.

Awards 
National Film Awards
National Film Award for Best Feature Film in Telugu

Nandi Awards
Nandi Award for Best  Feature Film - Gold - Adurthi Subba Rao and Akkineni Nageswara Rao

Filmfare Awards South
Filmfare Award for Best Film – Telugu

References 

1960s crime thriller films
1968 drama films
1968 films
Best Telugu Feature Film National Film Award winners
Films about adultery in India
Films about corruption in India
Films about social issues in India
Films directed by Adurthi Subba Rao
Films scored by K. V. Mahadevan
Indian black-and-white films
Indian courtroom films
Indian crime thriller films
Indian drama films
Indian legal films
1960s Telugu-language films